The Last Castaways is a children's book in The Last... series by Harry Horse, published in 2003. It won the Nestlé Smarties Book Prize Silver Award. It is a humorous adventure tale told through a series of letters from Grandfather to his grandchild, a ship's log and a diary.

Plot summary
Grandfather and his dog Roo accidentally win their old ship, the Unsinkable, in an auction and go on a fishing trip. However, the ship sinks and they are cast away on a desert isle. They find some treasure and rescue their ship.

References

2003 British novels
2003 children's books
British children's novels
Epistolary novels
Novels set on islands
Puffin Books books